The Pinnacle is a residential skyscraper in downtown Chicago, Illinois.  It was designed by Lucien Lagrange Architects and was developed by the Fordham Company.  Completed in 2004 the building measures 535 ft (169 m) tall with 49 stories.  The building houses its own on-site auto repair and wine tasting rooms.

See also
Fordham Company
The Fordham

References

Residential skyscrapers in Chicago
Residential condominiums in Chicago
Residential buildings completed in 2004
2004 establishments in Illinois
New Classical architecture